"Golden" is a single by American singer and songwriter Brandon Beal, featuring vocals from Danish band Lukas Graham. The song was released as a digital download in Denmark on 5 February 2016 through Then We Take the World and Universal Music Denmark. The song peaked at number one on the Danish Singles Chart. The song has also charted in Norway, Germany and Sweden.

Music video
A music video to accompany the release of "Golden" was first released onto YouTube on 11 February 2016. The video is based on a true story of Brandon's life leading up to his music career.

Track listing

Charts

Weekly charts

Year-end charts

Certifications

Release history

References

2016 songs
2016 singles
Lukas Graham songs
Number-one singles in Denmark
Songs written by Lukas Forchhammer
Songs written by Brandon Beal
Universal Music Group singles